Eucalyptus pauciflora subsp. pauciflora, commonly known as snow gum, cabbage gum or white sally is a tree or mallee that is endemic to eastern Australia. It has smooth bark, glossy green, lance-shaped, curved or elliptical leaves, flower buds in groups of between nine and fifteen, white flowers and cup-shaped, hemispherical or conical fruit.

Description
The bark is smooth, grey, white or cream-coloured with patches of yellow and usually has insect scribbles. Flowering occurs between August and April and the flowers are white.

Taxonomy and naming
Eucalyptus pauciflora was first formally described in 1827 by Kurt Polycarp Joachim Sprengel from an unpublished description by Franz Sieber and Sprengel's description was published in Systema Vegetabilium. When Lawrie Johnson and Donald Blaxell published subspecies debeuzevillei and niphophila, subspecies pauciflora became the autonym.

Distribution and habitat
Subspecies pauciflora is the most widespread subspecies of Eucalyptus pauciflora and is found from near Stanthorpe in the far south east of Queensland, through New South Wales, Victoria and Tasmania to Mount Gambier in the south east of South Australia. It also occurs from coastal areas such as the Mornington Peninsula to all but the highest altitudes in the Australian Alps. It grows in woodland and forest, often in pure stands, but often also with other eucalypt species.

References

pauciflora
Flora of Victoria (Australia)
Plants described in 1929
Flora of New South Wales
Flora of the Australian Capital Territory
Flora of Queensland
Flora of South Australia
Flora of Tasmania